English cinematographer Roger Deakins has received many awards and nominations over the course of his career.

Major Associations

Academy Awards
The Academy Awards are a set of awards given annually for excellence of cinematic achievements. The awards, organized by the Academy of Motion Picture Arts and Sciences, were first held in 1929 at the Hollywood Roosevelt Hotel. Deakins has been nominated for sixteen awards, winning twice.

{| class="wikitable"
|-
! scope="col" style="width:1em;"| Year
! scope="col" style="width:35em;"| Nominated work
! scope="col" style="width:40em;"| Category
! scope="col" style="width:5em;"| Result
! scope="col" style="width:1em;"| Ref
|-
| 1994
| The Shawshank Redemption
| rowspan=16 | Best Cinematography
| 
| rowspan=16 | 
|-
| 1996
| Fargo
| 
|-
| 1997
| Kundun
| 
|-
| 2000
| O Brother, Where Art Thou?
| 
|-
| 2001
| The Man Who Wasn't There
| 
|-
| rowspan=2 | 2007
| No Country for Old Men
| 
|-
| The Assassination of Jesse James by the Coward Robert Ford
| 
|-
| 2008
| The Reader
| 
|-
| 2010
| True Grit
| 
|-
| 2012
| Skyfall
| 
|-
| 2013
| Prisoners
| 
|-
| 2014
| Unbroken
| 
|-
| 2015
| Sicario
| 
|-
| 2017
| Blade Runner 2049
| 
|-
| 2019
| 1917
| 
|-
| 2022
| Empire of Light
| rowspan="1"
|- style="border-top:2px solid gray;"

BAFTA Film Awards
The BAFTA Award is an annual award show presented by the British Academy of Film and Television Arts. The awards were founded in 1947 as The British Film Academy, by David Lean, Alexander Korda, Carol Reed, Charles Laughton, Roger Manvell and others. Deakins has received five awards from eleven nominations.

{| class="wikitable
|-
! scope="col" style="width:1em;"| Year
! scope="col" style="width:35em;"| Nominated work
! scope="col" style="width:40em;"| Category
! scope="col" style="width:5em;"| Result
! scope="col" style="width:1em;"| Ref
|-
| 1996
| Fargo
| rowspan=11 | Best Cinematography
| 
| rowspan=11 | 
|-
| 2000
| O Brother, Where Art Thou?
| 
|-
| 2001
| The Man Who Wasn't There
| 
|-
| 2007
| No Country for Old Men
| 
|-
| 2008
| The Reader
| 
|-
| 2010
| True Grit
| 
|-
| 2012
| Skyfall
| 
|-
| 2015
| Sicario
| 
|-
| 2017
| Blade Runner 2049
| 
|-
| 2019
| 1917
| 
|-
| 2023
| Empire of Light 
| 
|- style="border-top:2px solid gray;"

American Society of Cinematographers

Satellite Awards

Independent Spirit Awards

Critics Awards

Chicago Film Critics Association

St. Louis Film Critics Association

New York Film Critics Circle

Boston Society of Film Critics

Online Film Critics Society

Houston Film Critics Society

Los Angeles Film Critics Association

National Society of Film Critics

Florida Film Critics Circle

Washington D.C. Area Film Critics Association

San Diego Film Critics Society

Critics' Choice Movie Awards

Dallas–Fort Worth Film Critics Association

References

Lists of awards received by person